"Annie" is a 1999 single by Canadian rock band Our Lady Peace from the album Happiness...Is Not a Fish That You Can Catch. It was less successful than other singles from that album, such as Thief.

Plot
The song revolves around a character, Annie, who seems to be unpopular, weird, and perhaps insane. Raine Maida has stated that this song is about a girl contemplating murdering students at her school, similar to the 1999 Columbine High School Massacre, which occurred three weeks after this song was written.

Writing
"I don't talk about my lyrics much (to the band)," Maida says, "But the day I heard the news, I said: 'Guys, the song Annie is written exactly about this.' I felt the need to tell them because I didn't want them to think that morning I had been reading the paper, writing lyrics."

Origin
While many of the songs on Happiness... were developed from ideas brought into the studio that remained unchanged throughout recording, "Annie" developed mainly from jam sessions over a long period of time. "It [Annie] took a long time," said Maida, "We had the verse for the longest time and it took weeks in the rehearsal hall just playing it as a band and finally the chorus happened. And it's all out, now it's a song. Jeremy started the beat to 'Annie' with Duncan  doing the bass groove and you know what? right away you know this is something to work on."

See also
Our Lady Peace
Happiness...Is Not a Fish That You Can Catch
Raine Maida

References

1999 singles
Our Lady Peace songs
Songs written by Raine Maida
1999 songs
Songs written by Jeremy Taggart
Sony BMG singles